Xylariopsis iriei is a species of beetle in the family Cerambycidae. It was described by Hayashi in 1976. It is known from Japan.

References

Apomecynini
Beetles described in 1976